Happy Valley is an area in Plumas County, California, United States, is located in Grizzly Valley.

Geography
Happy Valley is located at

References

Happy Valley (area)

External links
Plumas County, California Areas

Geography of Plumas County, California